Alberta Brianti and Sorana Cîrstea defeated all opponents and won against Alizé Cornet and Pauline Parmentier in the final to win the title.

Seeds
All seeds received a bye into the quarterfinals.

Draw

Draw

References
 Main Draw

Texas Tennis Open - Doubles
2011 Doubles